Barbet Schroeder (born 26 August 1941) is an Iranian-born Swiss film director and producer who started his career in French cinema in the 1960s, working with directors such as Jean-Luc Godard and Jacques Rivette. Since the late 1980s, he has directed many big budget Hollywood films, often mixing melodrama with the thriller genre in films like Single White Female, Kiss of Death, and Murder by Numbers. He has been nominated for the Palme d'Or for his 1987 film Barfly, and an Academy Award for Best Director for his 1990 film Reversal of Fortune.

Biography
Schroeder was born in Tehran, Iran, the son of Ursula, a German physician, and Jean-William Schroeder, a Swiss geologist. From ages 6 to 11, he lived in Colombia where his father was a diplomat for the Swiss government. Both he and his family then left for France, where he studied at the Sorbonne in Paris.

Schroeder's production company "Les Films du Losange", founded by him at age 23, produced some of the best-known films of the French New Wave. His directorial debut, More (1969), about heroin addiction, became a hit in Europe. Pink Floyd wrote music for this movie and released the album, More. They also wrote the soundtrack for his 1972 film La Vallée, released as the album Obscured by Clouds.

He later went on to direct more mainstream Hollywood fare, such as Barfly (1987) starring Mickey Rourke, Single White Female (1992), and Reversal of Fortune (1990), for which Jeremy Irons as Claus von Bülow received an Academy Award. Despite his many commercially successful films, Schroeder continues to be interested in making smaller films with a more limited audience, such as the adaptation of Colombian writer Fernando Vallejo's controversial novel La virgen de los sicarios (2000) or the documentary General Idi Amin Dada: A Self Portrait (1974), featuring extensive interviews with the Ugandan dictator and Terror's advocate (2007) about terrorism in the last 50 years seen through the eyes of a lawyer, Jacques Vergès, and his clients.

Schroeder has also made some appearances as an actor: playing one of the 'ghosts' in Jacques Rivette's Céline et Julie vont en bateau (Céline and Julie Go Boating), a cameo as a Porsche driver in Beverly Hills Cop III  (1994),  as the President of France in Mars Attacks! (1996), as  a hair products salesman in Paris, je t'aime (2006), and as the mechanic in The Darjeeling Limited (2007).

In 2009, Schroeder signed a petition in support of film director Roman Polanski, calling for his release after Polanski was arrested in Switzerland in relation to his 1977 charge for drugging and raping a 13-year-old girl.

Schroeder directed the 12th episode of the 3rd season of the American dramatic television series Mad Men that first aired on 1 November 2009.  The episode was entitled "The Grown Ups", and was notable for its depiction of the events of the Kennedy assassination.

Filmography

Television
2009: Mad Men: "The Grown-Ups" (TV)

References

External links

 Les Films du Losange 
 
 Barbet Schroeder Website
 A day on location with Schroeder's "Barfly" by Roger Ebert, 
 Barbet Schroeder, ombres et clarté from Jérôme d'Estais, Editions LettMotif, 2017, http://www.edition-lettmotif.com/produit/barbet-schroeder/

1941 births
Living people
French people of German descent
French people of Swiss descent
French male film actors
French film directors
People from Tehran